The Englishman who Went up a Hill but Came down a Mountain (novel) is a 1995 novel by Christopher Monger. 

The book, narrated by the author, is claimed to be based on a story heard by him from his grandfather about the real village of Taff's Well, in the old county of Glamorgan, and its neighbouring Garth Hill. 

It was turned into a romantic comedy film, directed by the author, film of the same name but with a different epilogue.

Plot
On a Sunday in 1917, during World War I, two English cartographers from the Ordnance Survey, the pompous George Garrad and his junior, Reginald Anson, arrive at the fictional Welsh village of Ffynnon Garw. Their job is to re-measure certain Welsh mountains, and their first task is to measure Ffynnon Garw. 

Garrard is the senior, many years retired from the army. He claims to have surveyed many locations around the British Empire, although he is fundamentally lazy and a drunk. Anson is a younger and much-decorated army officer, invalided out with severe shellshock from fighting in France, and is just starting to enjoy life again. 

Most of the men of the village are fighting in France, and those who are not work in the coalmine. The two men put up at the pub ‘Y Ffynnon’ owned by Morgan Morgan, known as Morgan the Goat, the only villager who doesn’t attend chapel. Within a short time, every villager is aware of the arrival of the map makers. They are extremely proud of ‘their’ mountain, which they claim to be the ‘The first mountain in Wales’. Garrard tells them that only if the mountain is 1000feet high or higher, will it appear on official maps. 

Two farmers, identical brothers known as Thomas Twp and Thomas Twp Too, are particularly interested in the methods of measurement. (Twp is a Welsh word meaning stupid or ignorant). Garrard, despite his assumed air of authority, doesn’t really understand the technicalities of the measuring instruments he uses, and delegates Anson to explain. Anson tries to describe in simple words what methods they will use to measure the height; starting with pedometers and inclinometers. Then they will use highly sensitive barometers to measure air pressure, but these only work when the pressure is stable. Finally, and most accurately, they will use a transit to compare the mountain’s height with other hills of known height.

The villagers take bets on the final height, but are outraged when Garrard concludes from the first, approximate, measurement, that it is only 984 feet. They are despondent at having ‘lost’ their mountain.

The villagers, aided and abetted by Morgan the Goat, so-called because of the many children he has fathered in the village, and their fiery spiritual leader Reverend Robert Jones, grasp its symbolism in restoring the community's war-damaged self-esteem, and conspire to delay the cartographers' departure so that the measurement can be done again. At a meeting, nominally chaired by Jones the JP, but led by Rev. Jones, the villagers discuss what to do. They consider a petition, but then Morgan proposes that they physically increase the height by adding soil. Rev Jones finds himself, for the first time in his life, in agreement with Morgan, but the meeting has reached a stalemate. Johnny Shellshocked, a badly affected local returned from France, finds the courage to stand and tell the meeting how the army moved earth and built hills in France. He concludes that ‘it’s possible – it’s just hard work.’

Garrard and Anson have a tight schedule and have orders from London to leave in the morning, but the villagers try to delay them. Williams the Petroleum (who doesn’t actually understand anything about motorcar engines) disables their car by breaking a vital part, which can only be replaced by a new part fetched from Cardiff. Morgan enlists his current paramour Betty From Cardiff (also known as Miss Elizabeth) to make up to Anson, which she does, initially with great reluctance. Tommy Twostroke, a miner who owns a motorbike, is enlisted to call out friends and relations in nearby villages, to assist them.

Davies the School, the local teacher, who has nothing to do (all the children are helping carry earth) calculates that they will need 4,714 cubic feet of earth (over 200 tons) to raise the mound to the required height. He doesn’t believe it to be possible, and is the one villager who doesn’t rally to assist. He isn’t locally born and doesn’t have the same feelings about the mountain.  

When the cartographers try to catch a train from the local station, they are informed by the stationmaster, Thomas The Trains. that the trains only carry coal, and that there are no passenger trains (which is blatantly untrue). Garrard retires to the pub in a huff to get drunk, but Anson is getting to quite like the villagers and their ways. He also starts to form an attraction for Betty, although she is the one to initially make advances.

Betty, despite her lady-like airs, is a maid-servant in a large house near Cardiff, who visits Morgan on her weekends off in her employer’s chauffeur-driven car. He fine clothes are her mistresses’ hand-me-downs. She recognises and appreciates Anson as a gentleman, compared to the uncouth Morgan (who is also two-timing her with Blod Jones, Johnny’s sister.)  

The Twp brothers (who are actually anything but twp), have an uncanny knowledge of weather prediction. They say it will rain, and it does. The mud on the hill starts washing off, lowering the mound. Williams and Johnny climb the mound to place a tarpaulin on the work under construction. But Johnny is caught in a violent thunderstorm and is badly affected. Williams manages to get him down, and at the pub, Anson takes charge and calms him down before Blod arrives to take over.

The rain continues. On Sunday, in chapel, Rev Jones encourages the villagers to finish the work, as the map makers must leave on the Monday morning train.  They also cover the mound with turf, with Anson happily joining in the work. But Rev Jones, who has climbed the mountain many times despite his advanced age, suffers a major heart attack. With his last breath, he asks to be buried on the mountain. The site is consecrated by Jones the JP and the Reverend is buried at the summit.

It is now dark and no measurements can be made. Betty persuades Anson to stay up there all night with her and measure the mountain with his transit at first light. 

When they descend from the mountain, they inform the people that the mountain is now officially 1002 feet high, and that they are engaged to be married.

In a short epilogue, the author recalls that Mr and Mrs Anson stayed in the village and both taught at the school, after Davies left in a fit of pique. He mentions that two photographs of the events exist, taken by a local pharmacist with an interest in photography, and that every villager later obtained a copy of the new map showing the mountain with the official height.

Quotations
‘....In France, we dug trenches ten miles long….we took earth from here and built hills there, we moved fields, you wouldn’t believe what we did…it’s possible. It’s just hard work’ (Johnny Shellshocked)

References

External links
 Englishman Who Went Up A Hill – Backsights Magazine (Surveyors Historical Society), originally published in Professional Surveyor, Nov./Dec. 1998

Anglo-Welsh novels
Novels set in Wales
History of Glamorgan
Corgi books
1995 British novels
Hyperion Books books